HMS Nightingale was a 24-gun sixth-rate ship of the Royal Navy, purchased in 1706 and in service in North America and English waters until 1716.

Nightingale was the fourth named ship since it was used for a vessel captured in 1626 and listed until 1628.

Specifications and construction
Initially intended for merchant service, the vessel was purchased for Naval use while still under construction at London's Blackwall Yard on 2 August 1706. She was launched on 9 September 1706. Her builder's Measure tonnage was 25355/94 tons. She carried a standardize armament of twenty 6-pounders on the upper deck (UD) and four 4-pounders on the quarterdeck. She was a full rigged ship.

Commissioned service
She was commissioned as Nightingale in 1707 under the command of Commander Covill Mayne, RN for service in the Downs. She went to Newfoundland in 1708. In March 1709 she was under the command of Captain Charles Gay, RN for the North Sea. She was assigned to the Scottish coast in 1711.  In January 1713 under Captain Ezekiel Wright she sailed for Maryland. She remained there until she returned in 1715.

Disposition
She was sold for £257 on 21 June 1716.

Notes

Citations

References
 Winfield 2009, British Warships in the Age of Sail (1603 – 1714), by Rif Winfield, published by Seaforth Publishing, England © 2009, EPUB , Chapter 6, The Sixth Rates, Vessels acquired from 2 May 1660, Purchased Vessels (1706), Nightingale
 Winfield 2007, British Warships in the Age of Sail (1714 – 1792), by Rif Winfield, published by Seaforth Publishing, England © 2007, EPUB , Chapter 6, Sixth Rates, Sixth Rates of 20 or 24 guns, Vessels in Service at 1 August 1714, Purchased Vessels (1706), Nightingale
 Colledge, Ships of the Royal Navy, by J.J. Colledge, revised and updated by Lt Cdr Ben Warlow and Steve Bush, published by Seaforth Publishing, Barnsley, Great Britain, © 2020, EPUB , Section A (Nightingale)

1700s ships
Corvettes of the Royal Navy
Ships of the Royal Navy